is a railway station in Kitami, Hokkaido Prefecture, Japan. Its station number is A60.

Lines
Hokkaido Railway Company
Sekihoku Main Line

Adjacent stations

Railway stations in Hokkaido Prefecture
Railway stations in Japan opened in 1911
Kitami, Hokkaido

References